Mickaël Tacalfred (born 23 April 1981) is a Guadeloupean professional footballer who plays as a defender for French side Reims Sainte-Anne. He represented the Guadeloupe national football team five times at the 2007 CONCACAF Gold Cup.

External links
 
 
 
 

1981 births
Living people
Sportspeople from Colombes
Footballers from Hauts-de-Seine
Guadeloupean footballers
Guadeloupe international footballers
French footballers
French people of Guadeloupean descent
Association football defenders
2007 CONCACAF Gold Cup players
2009 CONCACAF Gold Cup players
2011 CONCACAF Gold Cup players
Ligue 1 players
Ligue 2 players
Championnat National players
Red Star F.C. players
FC Martigues players
FC Rouen players
Angers SCO players
Dijon FCO players
Stade de Reims players
AJ Auxerre players
AS Béziers (2007) players
EF Reims Sainte-Anne players